Afghans in Ukraine are the country's largest diasporic community with origins outside of the former Soviet Union. 

During the existence of the Soviet Union, Afghans were the largest foreign group studying in Ukraine. After the resignation of the pro-Soviet president of Afghanistan, Mohammad Najibullah, in 1992, some Afghans in Ukraine applied for asylum. Other Afghans had returned to Afghanistan and served in the security forces during the Afghan Civil War of 1989 to 1992, with some then returning to Ukraine. Some male students married Ukrainian women. Many Afghans in Ukraine live in Kyiv and Dnipro, where some run small businesses that recruit workers from Afghanistan. There is also an Afghan community in Odesa, "made up of successive waves of exiles, refugees, and migrants" as well as commercial traders. The 2001 Ukrainian census recorded 1,008 people of Afghan nationality.

In 2019, Ukraine was hosting 1,034 Afghan refugees. At the end of 2020, 1,449 Afghans had permanent residency in Ukraine and 233 had temporary visas.

After the withdrawal of United States and other foreign troops from Afghanistan, in September 2021 the Ukrainian military evacuated Afghans alongside Ukrainian citizens from Afghanistan, now under the control of the Taliban. This followed previous rescue missions that had followed the fall of Kabul on 15 August 2021. In the context of the 2022 Russian invasion of Ukraine, TOLOnews reported that there were around 6,000 Afghan refugee in Ukraine, many of whom lacked permission to leave the country.

A number of Afghans in Ukraine have volunteered with the Ukrainian army against the Russian occupation in 2022. There is one known Afghan commander in the army, namely Jalal Noory, who joined following the Russian invasion.

Notable people
Mustafa Nayyem
Aslam Watanjar
Vida Mohammad

See also
Afghan diaspora
Afghan refugees

References

Afghan diaspora in Europe
Islam in Ukraine
Ukrainian people of Afghan descent